Edita Pučinskaitė (born November 27, 1975 in Naujoji Akmenė) is a Lithuanian  racing cyclist. For many years, she was one of the top competitors in women's road racing  with a victory in the World Road Race Championships in 1999 and several high finishes in major tours, world championships and the UCI points listings.

Major results

1994 
 1st  Overall Etoile Vosgienne
1st Stage 1
 2nd Anneville-sur-Scie Road Race
1995 
 3rd Road Race, UCI Road World Championships
1996 
 2nd Vertemate con Minoprio
 8th Road Race, UCI Road World Championships
 9th Trofeo Alfredo Binda
1997 
 1st Liberty Classic
 3rd Overall Giro d'Italia Femminile
 4th Vertemate con Minoprio
1998 
 National Road Championships
1st  Road Race
1st  Time Trial
 1st  Overall Grande Boucle Féminine Internationale
1st Stages 1, 3 & 4
 1st  Overall Thüringen-Rundfahrt der Frauen
1999 
 UCI Road World Championships
1st  Road Race
3rd Time Trial
 1st Time Trial, National Road Championships
 1st  Overall Giro della Toscana Int. Femminile
 2nd La Flèche Wallonne
 3rd Overall Grande Boucle Féminine Internationale
 8th Trofeo Alfredo Binda
2000 
 1st Trophée des Grimpeurs
 1st Stage 8 Giro d'Italia Femminile
 2nd Overall Grande Boucle Féminine Internationale
1st Stages 8 & 10
 10th Time Trial, Olympic Games
2001 
 1st  Overall Trophée d'Or Féminin
 1st Stage 3 Tour de l'Aude Cycliste Féminin
 2nd Road Race, UCI Road World Championships
 3rd Overall Giro d'Italia Femminile
 3rd GP Suisse Féminin
 4th La Flèche Wallonne
2002 
 1st  Time Trial, National Road Championships
 1st  Overall Emakumeen Euskal Bira
 3rd Overall Tour de l'Aude Cycliste Féminin
1st Stage 8
 6th La Flèche Wallonne
2003 
 National Road Championships
1st  Time Trial
2nd Road Race
 1st  Overall Tour Cycliste Féminin Ardèche Sud Rhone Alpes
 2nd Overall Giro d'Italia Femminile
 3rd Amstel Gold Race
 3rd Emakumeen Saria
 3rd Trofeo Riviera Della Versilia
 4th Road Race, UCI Road World Championships
 4th La Flèche Wallonne
2004 
 1st  Overall Trophée d'Or Féminin
1st Stage 4
 1st GP Ouest France
 1st Stage 2 Giro d'Italia Femminile
 3rd Overall Giro della Toscana Int. Femminile
1st Stage 2
 3rd Road Race, National Road Championships
 3rd Emakumeen Saria
 3rd La Flèche Wallonne
 3rd Trofeo Citta' di Rosignano
 6th Trofeo Alfredo Binda
 Olympic Games
9th Road Race
10th Time Trial
 10th Road Race, UCI Road World Championships
2005 
 1st  Overall Tour Cycliste Féminin Ardèche Sud Rhone Alpes
1st Stage 1a
 1st  Overall Vuelta Ciclista Femenina a el Salvador
1st Prologue, Stages 1 & 2
 1st Berner Rundfahrt
 1st Stage 4 Giro del Trentino Alto Adige - Südtirol
 1st Stage 6 Thüringen-Rundfahrt der Frauen
 2nd GP Ouest France
 3rd Overall Giro d'Italia Femminile
 3rd Overall Trophée d'Or Féminin
 10th Trofeo Alfredo Binda
 10th La Flèche Wallonne
2006 
 National Road Championships
1st  Time Trial
2nd Road Race
 1st  Overall Giro d'Italia Femminile
1st Stage 10
 1st  Overall Tour Cycliste Féminin Ardèche Sud Rhone Alpes
 3rd Overall Giro del Trentino Alto Adige - Südtirol
 3rd Overall Giro di San Marino
 6th La Flèche Wallonne
2007 
National Road Championships
1st  Time Trial
3rd Road Race
 1st  Overall Giro d'Italia Femminile
1st Prologue & Stage 3
 1st  Overall Giro del Trentino Alto Adige - Südtirol
1st Stages 1 & 2
 1st Emakumeen Saria
 1st Berner Rundfahrt
 2nd Overall Giro di San Marino
2008 
 3rd Open de Suede Vargarda
 9th Road Race, Olympic Games
2009 
 2nd Overall Trophée d'Or Féminin
 3rd Giornata Rosa di Nove
 10th Giro d'Italia Femminile
1st Stage 1
 10th Giro della Toscana Int. Femminile
2010 
 2nd Overall Thüringen-Rundfahrt der Frauen
1st Stage 2
 2nd Overall Trophée d'Or Féminin
 8th Overall Giro della Toscana Int. Femminile

References

External links

  
 
 
 
 

1975 births
Living people
People from Akmenė District Municipality
Lithuanian female cyclists
Olympic cyclists of Lithuania
Cyclists at the 2000 Summer Olympics
Cyclists at the 2004 Summer Olympics
Cyclists at the 2008 Summer Olympics
UCI Road World Champions (women)
Lithuanian Sportsperson of the Year winners